Hiwa Osman is an Iraqi Kurdish journalist and commentator.
He served as media advisor to President Jalal Talabani between 2005 & 2008.
He is a leading commentator and analyst on the politics and media of Kurdistan and Iraq. He is often quoted by the media about Iraq and Kurdistan.
He runs the blog Thoughts from Iraq. His writings are also published in Arabic in the respected Baghdad-based newspaper Alaalem.

Career
Hiwa Osman is the CEO of mediawan.me  The first agency of its kind in Kurdistan Region that provides media, creative and communications services.
Osman was previously the Iraq Country Director for the Institute for War and Peace Reporting (IWPR), media advisor to Iraqi president Jalal Talabani and also worked as a writer and producer with BBC News. He is also the son of Kurdish Leader Dr. Mahmoud Othman.

Awards
In 2012, Hiwa Osman won the Outstanding Contribution to New Media Award at the International Media Awards in London on 5 May.

References

External links
 http://mediawan.me/
 http://hiwaosman.com/
 http://internationalmediaawards.org/

Living people
Iraqi Kurdish people
Iraqi journalists
Iraqi bloggers
Date of birth missing (living people)
Year of birth missing (living people)